The Eastern Express is an overnight passenger train operated by the Turkish State Railways. The train runs  from Ankara Railway Station to Kars Railway Station in Kars. The train was the first overnight service east of Ankara. The Eastern Express stops in 7 provincial capitals: Ankara, Kırıkkale, Kayseri, Sivas, Erzincan, Erzurum and Kars. The first train ran in 1936 from  Istanbul's Haydarpaşa Terminal to Çetinkaya.

Before Ankara-Istanbul high-speed train project, the train ran between Istanbul and Kars.

Due to the increasing popularity of the train, TCDD Taşımacılık added a second train named the Touristic Eastern Express. This new train operates three times a week with fewer stops and costs more than the regular Eastern Express train. The Touristic Eastern Express was inaugurated on 29 May 2019 from Ankara.

History

During the 1930s, railway construction in Turkey reached its peak, where  of lines were completed. Ever since the Turkish State Railways were formed in 1927, railways extended to eastern Turkey. A main line was to be constructed from Ankara to Erzurum, where it would connect with the broad gauge line to the Turkey/Soviet Union border built by the Russian Empire in 1916. Construction of the line started in 1924 (by the CFAB, TCDD took over in 1927) and reached Kayseri in 1927, Sivas in 1930 and Çetinkaya in 1936. The Eastern Express made its first run with the opening of the line to Çetinkaya. The railway finally reached Erzurum in 1939. In the same year the Eastern Express started operating from Haydarpaşa to Erzurum. By transferring to a broad gauge train in Erzurum, passengers could travel to Kars, the last Turkish city before the Soviet Union. In 1962, the broad gauge line from Erzurum-Kars-Akkaya was made standard gauge by the State Railways. The Eastern Express was extended to Kars in 1962.

Consists
The Eastern Express had many consists over the years. The Turkish steam locomotives were the source of power from 1936 to the 1970s when the diesel locomotive took over. The consist today is:

DE 22 000, Head End Power Car, Coach, Coach, Coach, Diner, couchette, couchette, private cars at the end, helper engine if used

Route

Prior to the commencement of high-speed rail service from Istanbul to Ankara the train departed from Haydarpaşa Terminal on the Bosphorus and traveled along the south-eastern shores of Istanbul. The journey out of the extensive suburbs of the metropolis took an average of 45 minutes after which the train followed  the Bay of İzmit coastline before reaching İzmit and then traveling across the Sakarya plain. At Arifye, the line headed south through the mountainous route towards Eskişehir. After crossing many gorges and after Bilecik, the train ascended the Anatolian plateau and arrived in Ankara. 

After the break, the Eastern Express continues east through Ankara's eastern suburbs. After Kırıkkale, the train heads south-east towards Kayseri. At Kayseri the train refuels itself and has a crew change. The Eastern Express then continues east into the dusk. The route then heads north-east until Sivas, where the train has its third break. After Sivas the tracks travel through very mountainous terrain so the speed is limited. A small portion between Çetinkaya and Divriği is electrified for freight train carrying iron ore down south to the Mediterranean Sea. After Divriği the Eastern Express steadily climbs towards the Armenian Highlands. After a break in Erzurum, the train arrives at Kars towards the evening.

References

Notes

External links
 Doğu Ekspresi

Named passenger trains of Turkey